The Azerbaijan Chess Federation (AŞF) is the governing chess organization in Azerbaijan and is affiliated to the World Chess Federation FIDE. The Azerbaijan Chess Federation was founded in 1920 when Azerbaijan became a member of the Soviet Union as the Azerbaijan SSR the same year, and was reorganized in 1992, after Azerbaijan attained its independence with the dissolution of the Soviet Union, and became a member of FIDE the same year. Its headquarters are in Baku.

Elman Rustamov was the President of the Azerbaijan Chess Federation since 2007.

Executive committee
The executive committee includes:
President –  Mahir Mammedov
First Vice-president – Faiq Hasanov
Vice-president – Seymur Talibov
General Secretary – Ilaha Gadimova

Members
Its members include:

Grandmasters

International Masters

Women Grandmasters

Women International Masters

Competitions
The federation organizes the following chess competitions:
Azerbaijani Chess Championship
Azerbaijan Women's Chess Championship 
Azerbaijan Children's Chess Championship

International events
FIDE Grand-Prix 2008 (April 19 – May 6, 2008) in Baku
42nd Chess Olympiad (2016) in Baku

See also
Chess in Azerbaijan
List of Azerbaijani chess players
Fédération Internationale des Échecs (FIDE)

References

External links
  

 

National members of the European Chess Union
Chess in Azerbaijan
Chess
1920 establishments in Azerbaijan
Sports organizations established in 1920
Chess organizations
1920 in chess